Originally having participated in Olympics as the delegation of the Republic of China (ROC) from 1924 (Summer Olympics) to 1976 (Winter Olympics), China competed at the Olympic Games under the name of the People's Republic of China (PRC) for the first time in 1952, at the Summer Games in Helsinki, Finland, although they only arrived in time to participate in one event. That year, the International Olympic Committee (IOC) allowed both the PRC and ROC (Republic of China) (which fled to Taiwan after the Chinese Civil War) to compete, although the latter withdrew in protest. Due to the dispute over the political status of China, the PRC did not participate in the Olympics again until the 1980 Winter Olympics in Lake Placid, United States. Their first appearance at the Summer Olympic Games after 1952 was the 1984 Summer Olympics in Los Angeles, United States. The People's Republic of China staged boycotts of the Games of the XVI Olympiad in Melbourne Australia, Games of the XVII Olympiad in Rome Italy, Games of the XVIII Olympiad in Tokyo Japan, Games of the XIX Olympiad in Mexico City Mexico, Games of the XX Olympiad in Munich Germany, and Games of the XXI Olympiad in Montreal Canada. China also boycott the Games of the XXII Olympiad in Moscow USSR due to the American-led boycott and the ongoing Sino-Soviet split, together with the other countries.

As of 2022, China has finished first in the Summer Olympics once, second three times, third twice and third once in the Winter Olympics. With the nation's 11th appearance at the Summer and 12th appearance at the Winter Olympics, China is the most successful country overall in the Asia–Oceania region, making them the 5th most successful country in Olympics history, after the US, the Soviet Union, Germany and Great Britain.

The Chinese Olympic Committee in its current form was recognized in 1979. Before the Chinese Civil War, athletes competed as the Republic of China (ROC) at the Olympics. The ROC continued to compete from 1952 (Summer Olympics) to 1976 (Winter Olympics), but only representing athletes from the island of Taiwan (although the football team members of ROC in the 1960 Olympic Games were overwhelmingly Hong Kongers). The dispute over use of the name China resulted in the PRC boycotting the Games completely during these years.  In 1979, the International Olympic Committee passed a resolution for the ROC team to be designated Chinese Taipei, and this opened the door for the PRC to finally join the Olympic movement.

Hong Kong has had a distinct National Olympic Committee since 1950 and has competed at the Games since 1952. After the territory was returned to the PRC and the Hong Kong Special Administrative Region was created in 1997, this arrangement has continued, with Hong Kong competing independently from the rest of the nation under the name Hong Kong, China.

Olympic bids and hosted Games 
The People's Republic of China has hosted the Games on two occasions. Beijing is the first city to have hosted both the Summer and Winter Olympics.

Hosted Games

Unsuccessful bids

Overview of Olympic participation

Timeline of participation

China at the Summer Olympics

China at the Winter Olympics

Medals by sports

Medals by summer sport 
Chinese athletes have won medals in most of the current Summer Olympics sports.
The exceptions are triathlon, equestrian, rugby, skateboarding, sport climbing, surfing and water polo.

Medals by winter sport 
Chinese athletes have won medals in 7 out of 15 current Winter Olympics sports.
Most of the golds and half of the medals come from the sport of short track speed skating.

Best results in non-medaling sports:

Doping

A former Chinese doctor named Xue Yinxian has claimed the occurrence of alleged systematic doping of Chinese athletes in the Olympic Games (and other international sport events) in 2012 and 2017. She claims more than 10,000 athletes in China were doped in the systematic Chinese government doping program and that they received performance-enhancing drugs in the 1980s and 1990s. She claims that all international medals (both in the Olympics and other international competitions) that were won by Chinese athletes in the 1980s and 1990s must be revoked. This is contrary to previous statements by the Chinese government that had denied involvement in systematic doping and claimed that athletes doped individually. The International Olympic Committee and World Anti-Doping Agency investigated these allegations with no conclusions or actions taken.

Disqualified medalists
China has had four Olympic medals stripped after disqualifications.

Upgraded medalists

History

Early appearance and hiatus

After the establishment of the People's Republic of China in 1949, PRC sent a delegation to the Olympic Games for the first time at the 1952 Summer Olympics in Helsinki, Finland. The Chinese delegation (including athletes and officials) consisted of 38 men and 2 women, including the men's football team, the men's basketball team, and one swimmer.  Only the swimmer arrived in time to take part in the official competition, and the football team played two friendly matches. The Chinese stayed ten days in Helsinki and participated in the closing ceremony. The Republic of China's (ROC) team withdrew from the Games on July 17 in response to the IOC's decision to allow both PRC and ROC sportsmen and women to compete. This marked the beginning of the "two Chinas" conflict in the Olympic Movement, which resulted in the Chinese Olympic Committee's withdrawal from the IOC in August 1958.

In the 1970s, China normalized her relations with the United States through Ping Pong Diplomacy, and established diplomatic relations with the United States on January 1, 1979. The normalization finally led to the Chinese Olympic Committee's return to the IOC on October 25, 1979.

Sports summary
Till 2012, China won three-quarters of their gold medals (152 out of 201) and two-thirds of their medals (311 out of 473) in six sports: table tennis, badminton, diving, gymnastics, weightlifting, and shooting.

China recently dominated the gold medals in three of them, table tennis, badminton and diving. China won all golds four times in table tennis and one time in badminton, and won three-quarters of all diving golds since 1992.

The total dominance in table tennis and badminton also leads to negative consequences. Due to the low participations among non-Asian countries, these two sports may lose their positions in the Summer Olympics just like baseball and softball did after 2008.

While through the years, Chinese athletes got many breakthroughs in other sports that are traditionally China's weak sports. Among them, swimming is the potential one that may get into top five sports of China in the near future.

1984

China won 15 golds and ranked 4th at the 1984 Summer Olympics in Los Angeles.

Xu Haifeng won the first-ever gold medal for China in the shooting event of 50 m Pistol. It was called "a break through zero" – an event that brought great joy to the whole Chinese nation.

Li Ning won six medals in gymnastics, 3 golds, 2 silvers, and 1 bronze, earning him the nickname "Prince of Gymnasts" in China. Six medals in a single Olympics is still the record for any Chinese athlete.

Chinese women's volleyball team defeated USA women's team in the final and won China's first ball-game gold medal.

1988

China won 5 golds and ranked 11th at the 1988 Summer Olympics at Seoul, South Korea.

Li Meisu won China's first medal in athletics.

China also won first medals in rowing. A silver in women's coxed fours and a bronze in women's eights

1992

China won 16 golds and ranked 4th at the 1992 Summer Olympics at Barcelona, Spain.

Chen Yueling won China's first athletics gold medal in women's 10 km walk.

Chinese female swimmers glittered with 4 golds and 5 silvers. But the success was later shadowed by the doping incident of Chinese swimmers just two years later at the 1994 Asian Games, although none of the medalists in 1992 was involved in the 1994 incident.

Deng Yaping won two table tennis golds in women's singles and women's doubles. IOC president Juan Antonio Samaranch presented the gold medal to her after a promise made a year ago at 1991 World Table Tennis Championships.

Zhuang Xiaoyan won China's first judo gold medal in women's +72kg.

Zhang Xiaodong won silver medal in women's board (lechner), China's first medal in sailing.

Chinese women's basketball team lost final to Unified team, winning silver medal, China's best result in basketball.

1996

China won 16 golds and ranked 4th again at the 1996 Summer Olympics at Atlanta, USA.

Fu Mingxia won two diving golds in women's 3 m springboard and  women's 10 m platform, becoming the first female diver to accomplish this feat since 1960.

Deng Yaping won two golds in table tennis again, making her the first Chinese athlete to defend two events and win four Olympic gold medals. IOC president Juan Antonio Samaranch presented the gold medal to her again after a promise made four years ago at 1992 Olympics.

Liu Guoliang also won two table tennis golds in men's events. China won all four golds in table tennis for the first time.

Wang Junxia won gold in women's 5000 m and silver in women's 10000 m.

Chinese women's football team lost final to the USA team, winning silver medal, China's first medal in football.

2000

China won 28 golds and ranked 3rd at the 2000 Summer Olympics at Sydney, Australia.

Wang Nan won two golds in table tennis, China again won all four golds in table tennis.

Chen Zhong won China's first taekwondo gold medal in women's +67kg.

Jiang Cuihua won bronze in women's track time trial, China's first medal in cycling.
No ball-games team entered the final four, the worst performance China's since Olympic history.

2004

China won 32 golds and ranked 2nd at the 2004 Summer Olympics at Athens, Greece.

Liu Xiang became the first Chinese male athlete to win gold medal in an Olympic track event, 110 m hurdles, equaling the world record of 12.91 seconds. He became the China's flag bearer at the closing ceremony. Liu broke the world record with 12.88 seconds two years later in Lausanne, Switzerland.

Wang Yifu participated the Olympics for the record six consecutive times. He won gold in 10 m air pistol, his second gold and fourth medal in the event.

Meng Guanliang and Yang Wenjun won China's first canoeing gold medal in men's C-2 500 m.

Li Ting and Sun Tiantian won China's first tennis gold medal in women's doubles.

Wang Xu won China's first wrestling gold medal in women's freestyle 72 kg.

Chinese women's volleyball team come back from 0–2 deficit to defeat Russia women's team 3–2 in the final, winning China's second ball-game gold medal after 20 years.

2008

As host country, China won 48 golds, 22 silvers and 30 bronze, total 100 medals, ranked 1st at the 2008 Summer Olympics in Beijing.

Guo Jingjing won two golds in diving, becoming the first Chinese diver to defend two events successfully.

Zhang Yining won two golds in table tennis, becoming the second Chinese table tennis player to defend two events successfully after Deng Yaping.

Ma Lin also won two table tennis golds in men's events. China won all four golds in table tennis for the third time.

Zhong Man won China's first men's fencing gold in men's sabre, 24 years after Luan Jujie won China's first women's fencing gold in 1984.

Zhang Juanjuan won China's first archery gold in women's individual, breaking the long-time Korean dominance in the sport.

Zou Shiming and Zhang Xiaoping won China's first boxing golds in men's events.

Yin Jian won China's first sailing gold in sailboard event in women's sailboard.

China won first rowing gold in women's quadruple sculls.

Chinese gymnasts won 11 golds, the best in history. Zou Kai won 3 golds in one team event and two individual events.

China's top star Liu Xiang pulled out of the first round of 110 m hurdles due to injury.

2012

China won 38 golds and finished 2nd at the 2012 Summer Olympics in London, Great Britain.

Sun Yang, the men's 1500 m freestyle world-record-holder before the Olympics, became the first Chinese male swimmer to win gold in Olympics. He won two golds in men's 400 m freestyle and men's 1500 m freestyle, breaking the Olympic record and his own world record respectively.

Ye Shiwen became the first Chinese female swimmer to win two golds in a single Olympics. She won golds in women's 200 m medley and women's 400 m medley, breaking the Olympic record and world record respectively.

Chen Ding won gold in men's 20 km walk, becoming the second Chinese male athlete to win Olympic athletics gold medal after Liu Xiang did in 2004.

Chen Ruolin won two golds in diving, becoming the second Chinese diver to defend two events successfully after Guo Jingjing.

Wu Minxia won diving gold in women's sync 3m springboard, becoming the only Chinese athlete to win three gold medals in a single event. She also won gold in women's 3m springboard, giving her all three medals in three participations in this event after silver in 2004 and bronze in 2008.

Zou Kai won two golds in gymnastics, becoming the only Chinese athlete to win five gold medals in Olympics.

Xu Lijia won gold in women's laser radial class, China's first gold medal in the sailboat event of sailing. She later became the China's flag bearer at the closing ceremony.

Lin Dan won badminton gold in men's singles, becoming the first athlete to defend the men's singles title in Olympic badminton history.

Zhao Yunlei won two golds in two badminton double events, becoming the only athlete to win two badminton gold medals in a single Olympics.

Cao Zhongrong won silver in men's event of modern pentathlon, China's first medal in the sport.

Chinese table tennis team won all four golds for the fourth time. Chinese badminton team won all five golds for the first time, but was a little shadowed by the disqualification of China's top seed women's double duo for not using best efforts.

China's top star Liu Xiang pulled out of the first round of 110 m hurdles due to injury again. Two of his three pull-outs in 12 years' career came from two Olympics first round heats.

No Chinese ball-game teams entered the final four, the worst performance in Chinese Summer Olympics history.

2016

China won 26 golds and ranked 3rd at the 2016 Summer Olympics in Rio de Janeiro, Brazil.

Sun Yang won a gold medal in men's 200 m freestyle, becoming the only Chinese male swimmer to have won gold in 2 Olympic games.

Gong Jinjie and Zhong Tianshi won China's first cycling gold medal in women's team sprint.

Feng Shanshan won China's first golf medal.

Dong Bin set a new personal best (17.58 meters) in the men's triple jump event and won a bronze medal. This was China's first medal from Olympic triple jump events.

Chinese women's volleyball team won a third gold medal after 12 years.

Wu Minxia defended her Women's 3m Synchro event for the fourth time, becoming the only Chinese athlete to ever do so. This also makes her the most successful Chinese athlete of all time, with 5 Golds, 1 Silver, and 1 Bronze.

2020

China won 38 gold, 32 silver, 18 bronze medals and ranked 2nd at the 2020 Summer Olympics in Tokyo, Japan in August 2021.

Su Bingtian finished the men's 100 m semi-final with a new Asian Record at 9.83 seconds, and became the first Chinese athlete and second Asian athlete to compete in a 100 m final, in which he finished as the 6th place. He was also the flag bearer in the closing ceremony. With him, Chinese relay team won China's first medal in athletic relays.

Gong Lijiao won a gold medal in women's shot put and become the first ever Chinese athlete to won a gold medal in any field events and the first Asian to win an Olympic gold medal in women's shot put.

Liu Shiying won a gold medal in women's javelin throw. She became the first Asian and Chinese to win a gold medal in Olympic javelin throw events.

Lü Xiaojun lifted a combined weight of 374 kg to win a gold medal in the men's 81 kg weightlifting event. This was his third Olympic medal. He also became the oldest weightlifter champion (37 years and 4 days) in modern Olympics. He became the first ever Chinese athlete to win three gold medals in an individual event, after promoted a gold medal.

Winter Games

Sports summary
China won medals in only 6 of the 15 Winter Olympics sports. Most of the golds and half of the medals come from short track speed skating.

1980–1988
No medals.

1992–1998
Ye Qiaobo won China's first Winter Olympics medal in speed skating.

Chen Lu won consecutive bronze medals in 1994 and 1998, becoming the first Chinese figure skater to medal at the Winter Olympic Games.

2002
Yang Yang (A) won first Winter Olympics gold medal in short track speed skating, as the first gold medal for Team China in Olympic Winter Games.

2006
Han Xiaopeng, first male athlete to win Winter Olympics gold medal in freestyle skiing.

2010
Wang Meng shined in short track speed skating with three golds.

Shen Xue and Zhao Hongbo finally won figure skating gold in the event of pair skating after four participations.

Wang Bingyu and her team (Yue Qingshuang, Liu Yin, Zhou Yan and Liu Jinli)  created history by winning the first curling Olympic medal for China in the women's tournament.

2014
China won 3 gold, 4 silver, 2 bronze medals and ranked 12th at the 2014 Winter Olympics in Sochi, Russia in February 2014.

Zhang Hong won first Chinese gold medal in speed skating.

2018
China won 1 gold, 6 silver, 2 bronze medals and ranked 16th at the 2018 Winter Olympics in Pyeongchang, South Korea in February 2018.

Liu Jiayu won first ever Olympic medal in snowboarding for China.

Wu Dajing became the first Chinese male short track speed skating Olympic champion by breaking the world record at the 500-metre event.

2022
China won 9 gold, 4 silver, 2 bronze medals and ranked 3rd at the 2022 Winter Olympics in Beijing, China in February 2022, as the first ever home winter games.

Ailing Eileen Gu became the first ever freestyle skier to win three medals at one Olympic Game, the first female Chinese gold medalist in freestyle skiing, and the most successful freestyle skier ever in Olympic freestyle skiing event (with 2 gold medals and 1 silver medals).

Yan Wengang won the first ever medal in skeleton for Team China, bronze in men's single.

Xu Mengtao finally won the first ever gold in women's aerial since the first silver medal won by Xu Nannan in Nagano 1998 and 5 silver medals & 2 bronze medals won by Team China in this event at former games.

Su Yiming became the first Chinese athlete to win a gold in Olympic snowboarding events.

Gao Tingyu became the first Chinese male athlete to win a gold in Olympic speed skating events.

Medalists

Summer Olympics

Since Chinese athletes are more likely to compete in more than one event in the sport of diving, gymnastics, table tennis, swimming, and more likely to compete in several Olympic games in the sport of shooting, most multiple medalists listed in the following three tables come from these five sports.

Multiple medalists
This is a list of Chinese athletes who have won at least three gold medals or five medals at the Summer Olympics.

Multiple gold medalists at a single game

This is a list of Chinese athletes who have won at least two gold medals at a single Summer Olympics. Order first by golds, then by sports, then by year.

Multiple medalists in a single event
This is a list of Chinese athletes who have won at least three medals in a single event at Summer Olympics. Order first by medals, then by sport, then by golds.

2 Wang Yifu competed at six Olympic Games from 1984 to 2004. But 10 m air pistol was introduced to the Olympics after 1988. So he competed five times in the event. He ranked 15th in 1988 and ranked top two at the next four Olympics. 
3 Guo Jingjing competed at four Olympic Games from 1996 to 2008. She ranked 5th in the event of 10m platform diving in 1996 at the age of 15. After that, due to rapid increase of height and weight, she switched to more suitable springboard diving. She competed in two 3m springboard events in the next three Olympics and got six medals.
4 Chen Jing competed for China in 1988, and for Chinese Taipei in 1996 and 2000.
5 The category was 77 kg in 2012 and 2016 Olympics, and then changed to 81 kg in 2000.
6 The category was 57 kg in 1992 and 1996 Olympics, and then changed to 58 kg in 2000.

Most appearances
This is a list of Chinese athletes who competed in at least four Summer Olympics. Still active athletes are marked in bold. Age 15- and 40+ are marked in bold.

6 Luan Jujie competed for China in 1984, winning China's first Olympic fencing gold. She moved to Canada in 1985 and competed for Canada in 1988, 2000, and 2008.

The youngest and oldest gold medalists

Winter Olympics

Multiple medalists
This is a list of Chinese athletes who have won at least two gold medals or three medals at the Winter Olympics. Still active athletes are marked in bold.

Multiple gold medalists at a single game
This is a list of Chinese athletes who have won at least two gold medals at a single Winter Olympics. Order first by golds, then by sports, then by year.

Multiple medalists in a single event
This is a list of Chinese athletes who have won at least three medals in a single event at Winter Olympics. Order first by medals, then by sport, then by golds.

Most appearances
This is a list of Chinese athletes who competed in at least four Winter Olympics. Still active athletes are marked in bold.

The youngest and oldest gold medalists

Milestones

Summer Games
1st medal : Xu Haifeng, Shooting, 1984
1st gold medal : Xu Haifeng, Shooting, 1984
10th gold medal : Li Ning, Gymnastics, 1984
50th gold medal : Deng Yaping, Table tennis, 1996
100th gold medal : Zhang Yining, Table tennis, 2004
200th gold medal : Chen Ruolin, Diving, 2012

Winter Games
1st medal: Ye Qiaobo, Speed skating, 1992
1st gold medal : Yang Yang (A), Short track speed skating, 2002
10th gold medal : Li Jianrou, Short track speed skating, 2014

Flagbearer

Summer Games

Winter Games

Hosting Olympic logo and mottos

2008 Summer Olympics

The 2008 Summer Olympics marks the milestone for China, where this was the first time it hosting the Olympic Games. The country's capital, Beijing, was chosen as the host city. The motto of the Olympic Games at that time is One World One Dream (同一个世界 同一个梦想)

2014 Summer Youth Olympics

The 2014 Summer Youth Olympics
marks the second time China hosted the Olympics, but it was held in Nanjing. Its motto is Share the Games, Share our Dreams (分享青春, 共筑未来)

2022 Winter Olympics

The upcoming 2022 Winter Olympics marks the third time China hosted the Olympics, and the second time held in Beijing. The new motto of this game is Together for a Shared Future (一起向未来) . Its previous motto was Joyful Rendezvous Upon Pure Ice and Snow (纯洁的冰雪 激情的约会)

See also
 :Category:Olympic competitors for China
 List of Olympic medalists for China
 China at the Asian Games
 China at the Paralympics
 Sport in China
 Chinese Olympic politics
 Sports and Olympic Committee of Macau, China

References

External links